20th Party Congress may refer to:
20th National Congress of the Chinese Communist Party (2022)
20th National Congress of the People's Party (Spain) (2022)
20th National Congress of the Kuomintang (2017–2020)
20th Congress of the Communist Party of the Soviet Union (1956)